Seminario is a surname. Notable people with the surname include:

Diego Seminario (born 1989), Peruvian actor and industrial designer
Juan Seminario (born 1936), Peruvian footballer
Miguel Grau Seminario (1834–1879), Peruvian naval officer

Spanish-language surnames